Reynir Brynjólfsson (born 7 February 1945) is an Icelandic alpine skier. He competed in two events at the 1968 Winter Olympics.

References

1945 births
Living people
Reynir Brynjólfsson
Reynir Brynjólfsson
Alpine skiers at the 1968 Winter Olympics
Reynir Brynjólfsson
20th-century Icelandic people